is a rower from Toyama, Japan. She competed in the women's coxless pair event at the 1992 Summer Olympics.

References

1971 births
Living people
Japanese female rowers
Olympic rowers of Japan
Rowers at the 1992 Summer Olympics
Asian Games medalists in rowing
Rowers at the 1990 Asian Games
Rowers at the 1994 Asian Games
Asian Games silver medalists for Japan
Medalists at the 1990 Asian Games
Medalists at the 1994 Asian Games
20th-century Japanese women